The 1904 Boston Americans season was the fourth season for the professional baseball franchise that later became known as the Boston Red Sox. The Americans finished first in the American League (AL) with a record of 95 wins and 59 losses,  games ahead of the New York Highlanders. The team was managed by Jimmy Collins and played its home games at Huntington Avenue Grounds. The Americans were set to play the National League (NL) champion New York Giants in the 1904 World Series; however, the Giants refused to play.

Regular season 
Prior to the regular season, the team held spring training in Macon, Georgia.
 April 14: The regular season opens with an 8–2 loss to the New York Highlanders at Hilltop Park in New York City.
 April 18: In the home opener, the Americans defeat the visiting Washington Senators, 5–0.
 May 5: Cy Young throws the first no-hitter in franchise history; it was also a perfect game. The Americans beat the Philadelphia Athletics by a score of 3–0 in Boston.
 June 12: In their longest game of the season, the Americans defeat the St. Louis Browns, 2–1 in 16 innings, at Sportsman's Park in St. Louis.
 June 18: The team's highest scoring game of the season ends as a 13–10 win in 11 innings, on the road against the Chicago White Sox.
 August 17: Jesse Tannehill throws a no-hitter against the White Sox at South Side Park in Chicago. 
 October 10: The regular season ends with a doubleheader on the road against the Highlanders; Boston won the first game, 3–2, while New York won the second game, 1–0 in 10 innings.

Statistical leaders
The offense was led by Buck Freeman, who hit 7 home runs and had 84 RBIs, and Freddy Parent with a .291 batting average. The pitching staff was led by Cy Young, who made 43 appearances (41 starts) and pitched 40 complete games with a 26–16 record and 1.97 ERA, while striking out 200 in 380 innings. The team had two other 20-game winners; Bill Dinneen (23–14) and Jesse Tannehill (21–11).

Season standings 

The team had three games end in a tie; September 13 at Philadelphia, September 14 vs. New York, and September 15 vs. New York. Both ties against New York were the second games of doubleheaders. Tie games are not counted in league standings, but player statistics during tie games are counted.

Record vs. opponents

Opening Day lineup 

Source:

Roster

Player stats

Batting

Starters by position 
Note: Pos = Position; G = Games played; AB = At bats; H = Hits; Avg. = Batting average; HR = Home runs; RBI = Runs batted in

Other batters 
Note: G = Games played; AB = At bats; H = Hits; Avg. = Batting average; HR = Home runs; RBI = Runs batted in

Pitching

Starting pitchers 
Note: G = Games pitched; IP = Innings pitched; W = Wins; L = Losses; ERA = Earned run average; SO = Strikeouts

References

External links 
1904 Boston Americans team page at Baseball Reference
1904 Boston Americans season at baseball-almanac.com

Boston Red Sox seasons
Boston Americans
Boston Americans
1900s in Boston
American League champion seasons